Norberto Murara Neto (born 19 July 1989), commonly known as Neto, is a Brazilian professional footballer who plays as a goalkeeper for and captains Premier League club AFC Bournemouth.

Neto began his career with Brazilian side Athletico Paranaense and later played for Italian side Fiorentina. He joined Juventus in 2015, where he won the domestic double in each of his two seasons with the club, serving as a back-up to starter Gianluigi Buffon in the league, but appearing in all of the club's games in both of their victorious Coppa Italia campaigns. From 2017, he played in Spain's La Liga as first choice for Valencia and back-up at Barcelona. He joined Premier League club AFC Bournemouth in 2022, becoming captain.

He was first called up for the Brazil national team in 2010 but did not earn his first cap until 2018. He won a silver medal at the 2012 Olympics and was part of the nation's squad at the 2015 Copa América.

Club career

Athlético Paranaense
Born in Araxá, Minas Gerais, Neto moved as a teenager from his state's Cruzeiro to Athletico Paranaense. He made his professional debut at the age of 19 in the Campeonato Brasileiro Série A due to the suspension of first-choice Rodrigo Galatto, and kept a clean sheet in a 3–0 home win over Grêmio Barueri on 16 August 2009. His only other appearance of the season came on 29 November in the final home game, as a half-time substitute for Galatto in a 2–0 win over Botafogo also at the Arena da Baixada.

After Galatto and second-choice Vinícius left Atlético-PR, Neto became the first-choice goalkeeper for the 2010 season. In the opener on 9 May, he was sent off in a 2–1 loss at Corinthians for a foul on Dentinho; following a two-match suspension, he returned and started every game for the club until October, when he was forced to miss several games after being called up for the Brazil national team.

Fiorentina

Neto agreed a deal to play for Italian club Fiorentina on 5 January 2011, signing the contract three days later for a €3.5 million transfer fee split into three payments and Atlético-PR retaining 25% of his economic rights.
Second-choice to Artur Boruc, he made his debut in the 4th round of the 2011–12 Coppa Italia on 24 November 2011 at home to fellow Tuscans Empoli, winning 2–1.<ref>{{cite news |last1=Pirrone |first1=Dario |title=Fiorentina-Empoli 2-1: L'avventura dei viola in Coppa Italia continua, ma che fatica...|trans-title=Fiorentina-Empoli 2-1: The 'Violas adventure in the Coppa Italia continues, but what an exhausting game... |url=https://www.goal.com/it/news/98/coppa-italia/2011/11/24/2772870/fiorentina-empoli-2-1-lavventura-dei-viola-in-coppa-italia |access-date=25 June 2022 |publisher=Goal |date=24 November 2011 |language=Italian}}</ref> He made his Serie A debut on 29 April in a 2–0 loss at Atalanta.

In 2013–14, with Boruc and Emiliano Viviano now having left the Stadio Artemio Franchi, Neto became the first-choice goalkeeper for La Viola''. He made his continental debut in their run to the last 16 of the UEFA Europa League, playing nine games; this started with a 2–1 win at Grasshopper Zürich in the play-off on 22 August and concluded with elimination by rivals Juventus in March 2014. On 3 May, he played in the 2014 Coppa Italia Final, which Fiorentina lost 3–1 to Napoli.

Fiorentina reached the semi-finals of the 2014–15 UEFA Europa League, where they were eliminated by eventual winners Sevilla. Neto played seven of the eight knockout games, with Romanian Ciprian Tătărușanu playing the preceding fixtures before injury.

Juventus
Neto joined Juventus on a four-year contract on 3 July 2015, after his Fiorentina deal expired. He made his debut on 23 September, starting in a 1–1 Serie A home draw against Frosinone. On 16 December, he achieved his first clean sheet with the club in a 4–0 win over cross-city rivals Torino during a Coppa Italia match. He kept his first league clean sheet in the final fixture on 14 May 2016, a 5–0 home win over Sampdoria, as Juventus celebrated their Serie A title victory. A week later, he kept another clean sheet to win the cup final 1–0 against A.C. Milan in Rome's Stadio Olimpico.

In his second season with the club, Neto made his UEFA Champions League debut on 7 December 2016, in Juventus's final group match, keeping a clean sheet in a 2–0 home win over Dinamo Zagreb. Although he served as a back-up to Gianluigi Buffon in the league, he was the team's starting goalkeeper in the Coppa Italia, featuring in all their matches including the 2–0 victory over Lazio in the final on 17 May 2017. Juventus won their 12th Coppa Italia title, becoming the first team to win three consecutive championships and league-cup doubles.

Valencia
On 7 July 2017, Neto joined Valencia on a four-year contract in a €7 million deal, plus an additional €2 million in conditional bonuses. He made his debut for the club on 18 August, starting in a 1–0 La Liga home win against Las Palmas.

While Neto was the first-choice goalkeeper in both of his league seasons at the Mestalla Stadium, Jaume Doménech played all the Copa del Rey games including the 2–1 win over Barcelona in the 2019 final.

Barcelona

On 27 June 2019, it was announced that Neto would move to Barcelona for €26m plus €9m in add-ons. He arrived as back-up for Marc-André ter Stegen, a day after fellow goalkeeper Jasper Cillessen moved in the other direction. He made his debut on 10 December in a 2–1 win at Inter Milan at the end of the Champions League group stage, with manager Ernesto Valverde resting most of his key players. He played two league games over the season, starting on 4 January 2020 in the Derbi barceloní against Espanyol, a 2–2 away draw while Ter Stegen was injured.

Neto played in Barcelona's first six league games and three of the six UEFA Champions League group stage matches of 2020–21, as his German teammate took until the end of October to recover from a knee injury; this included a 3–1 home loss to Real Madrid in El Clásico on 24 October.

AFC Bournemouth
On 7 August 2022, Neto joined Premier League club AFC Bournemouth on a free transfer, signing a 12-month contract. He was initially back-up to Mark Travers. He made his debut on 23 August in the second round of the EFL Cup away to Norwich City, winning on penalties after a 2–2 draw; eight days later he played his first league game, a goalless draw at home to Wolverhampton Wanderers. He remained first choice until suffering a hamstring injury on 24 October in the 2–0 loss at West Ham United, with Travers replacing him at half time; he returned on 14 January 2023 for a defeat by the same score away to Brentford, and was praised by manager Gary O'Neil for recovering ahead of schedule.

International career
In September 2010, 21-year-old Neto had his first call-up for the Brazil national football team under manager Mano Menezes, who chose several new young players with an eye to the 2012 Olympic tournament. He took no part in the friendlies against Iran in the United Arab Emirates and against Ukraine in England, He was called up again in October to face Argentina in another exhibition in Qatar.

Neto was in the Brazil squad for the 2012 Olympic tournament in Great Britain, playing in their two opening group stage wins over Egypt and Belarus before being replaced by Gabriel as the nation went on to win the silver medal.

Neto was one of seven stand-by players named by Dunga for the senior team at the 2015 Copa América, but was eventually called into the main squad after a knee injury to Diego Alves. He remained on the bench as Jefferson played as first-choice goalkeeper, and Brazil reached the quarter-finals.

On 12 September 2018, eight years after his first senior call-up, Neto made his debut for Brazil when he started in a 5–0 friendly win over El Salvador in the United States.

Career statistics

Club

International

Honours

Juventus
Serie A: 2015–16, 2016–17
Coppa Italia: 2015–16, 2016–17
Supercoppa Italiana: 2015
UEFA Champions League runner-up: 2016–17

Valencia
Copa del Rey: 2018–19

Barcelona
Copa del Rey: 2020–21

Brazil U23
Olympic Silver Medal: 2012

References

External links

Profile at the AFC Bournemouth website

1989 births
Living people
Sportspeople from Minas Gerais
Brazilian footballers
Association football goalkeepers
Campeonato Brasileiro Série A players
Club Athletico Paranaense players
Serie A players
ACF Fiorentina players
Juventus F.C. players
La Liga players
Valencia CF players
FC Barcelona players
Premier League players
AFC Bournemouth players
Brazilian expatriate footballers
Expatriate footballers in Italy
Expatriate footballers in Spain
Expatriate footballers in England
Brazilian expatriate sportspeople in Italy
Brazilian expatriate sportspeople in Spain
Brazilian expatriate sportspeople in England
Brazil youth international footballers
Olympic footballers of Brazil
Footballers at the 2012 Summer Olympics
Olympic silver medalists for Brazil
Olympic medalists in football
Medalists at the 2012 Summer Olympics
Brazil international footballers
2015 Copa América players